Jidori is a Japanese homophone which may refer to:

Jidori,, literally "local chicken", chickens whose parents or one parent are native to Japan and raised according to a prescribed method, such as cage free or free range
Jidori,, literally "something taken of oneself", a selfie